Marcel Lenz (born 16 February 1987) is a German former professional footballer who played as a centre-back. In 2014, Lenz got married in 2014 and took his wife's last name. He was born Marcel Stadel.

References

External links

1987 births
Living people
German footballers
Association football central defenders
3. Liga players
Arminia Bielefeld players
KSV Hessen Kassel players
Kickers Offenbach players
VfL Osnabrück players
TuS Dassendorf players